The North Carolina Tar Heels football team competes as part of the National Collegiate Athletic Association (NCAA) Division I Football Bowl Subdivision (FBS), representing the University of North Carolina at Chapel Hill in the Coastal Division of the Atlantic Coast Conference (ACC). Since the establishment of the team in 1888, North Carolina has appeared in 37 bowl games, including four combined appearances in the traditional "big four" bowl games (the Rose, Sugar, Cotton, and Orange).

North Carolina's first bowl game was in 1947, when head coach Carl Snavely led them to the Sugar Bowl, where they lost to Georgia 20–10. Snavely led the Tar Heels to another Sugar Bowl and one Cotton Bowl, which both resulted in losses for the Tar Heels. Taking over for Snavely following the 1952 season was George Barclay, who did not lead the Tar Heels to any bowl games during his three-season tenure. Barclay's successor, Jim Tatum, coached for three years without reaching a bowl game. Jim Hickey replaced Tatum after the 1958 season and coached North Carolina to one bowl game, the 1963 Gator Bowl, where they won their first bowl game in program history.

Bill Dooley succeeded Hickey as head coach and led the Tar Heels to six bowl games through his eleven-season run as head coach. Of the six bowls Dooley led North Carolina to, they won only one, the 1972 Sun Bowl. Dick Crum took over as head coach before the 1978 season. Crum led the Tar Heels to four consecutive bowl victories before losing the final two of his tenure at Carolina. Crum handed over control of the program to Mack Brown after the 1987 season. Brown assisted the Tar Heels into making a bowl game in six straight seasons; however, before the 1998 Gator Bowl, Brown accepted the head coaching position at the University of Texas at Austin and was subsequently barred from coaching in the bowl game. Defensive coordinator Carl Torbush was promoted to head coach. Torbush led the Tar Heels to two bowl victories – the 1998 Gator Bowl and the 1998 Las Vegas Bowl – before being let go after the 2000 season.

North Carolina alum John Bunting was hired as coach before the 2001 season. Bunting led the Tar Heels to a 16–10 Peach Bowl victory in his inaugural season, and later to the 2004 Continental Tire Bowl, where they lost to Boston College. Bunting was dismissed after the 2006 season. North Carolina's then Athletic Director, Dick Baddour, subsequently hired Butch Davis to be the coach of the Tar Heels. Davis brought the Tar Heels to three bowl games before being fired in the midst of an NCAA investigation into the North Carolina football program. Everett Withers took over the program as the interim head coach for the 2011 season. Withers helped the Tar Heels become bowl-eligible and participate in the 2011 Independence Bowl, where they lost by seventeen points to the Missouri Tigers. Larry Fedora, coming off of a successful season as the head coach for the Southern Miss Golden Eagles football team, was hired to be the next head coach for the Tar Heels. After obtaining a bowl eligible record but not being able to play in the postseason due to self-imposed sanctions in his first year, Fedora led North Carolina to a victory in the Belk Bowl over Cincinnati in his second season.

Key

Bowl games

Notes

References
General

Specific

Bibliography

 
 

North Carolina Tar Heels

North Carolina Tar Heels bowl games